The October 2013 Myanmar bombings were a string of unexplained bombings that killed three people and injured 10 others from 11 to 17 October 2013 in different parts of Myanmar (Burma). There is no strong evidence to blame a particular group, but these attacks were likely connected.

Bombings
On 11 October, a bomb blast at a guesthouse in Taungoo Township, Bago Region, killed two people and injured one. Then on 13 October, a bomb exploded at a bus stop in Insein Township, Yangon. The blast damaged a bus stop and a billboard but no one was injured. Another homemade bomb attached to the underside of a truck exploded in Thaketa Township, Yangon when two youths tried to remove a clock attached to the device. The two youths were only slightly injured in the blast.

On 14 October, a small mine was found fixed under a table at a restaurant in Yangon and removed safely without being triggered. Another bomb was also found at a restaurant in Mandalay. Police removed the bomb and detonated it in a controlled explosion outside of the restaurant.

A small bomb in 14 October night ripped through a ninth story room at Traders Hotel, an upscale hotel in downtown Yangon that is popular among tourists and foreign business travellers. An American woman who was staying at the hotel with her family was injured in the blast, which took place in the bathroom of her hotel room. Small devices also exploded at a hotel and at a pagoda in Sagaing Region before dawn on 15 October..

On 17 October, two more explosions in Namkham, Shan State had killed one and wounded six was the last of bombings.

Reactions and investigations
The police detained eight suspects following bomb blasts. A detainee reportedly served in the past in Karen National Union, a rebel group that signed a cease-fire with the government. The police  identified one detained bombing suspect manages a mining project in Karen State. A group of Karen businessmen allegedly offered him a permit for a gold mine if he successfully planted bombs at hotels and restaurants.

The Karen National Union denied involvement in the bomb plots and agreed to help the government investigate the bomb blasts and search for more suspects.

Small bomb blasts occurred frequently under previous military regime, and were normally blamed on armed ethnic groups, although many believed the authorities were behind the explosions. These incidents had become rarer in recent years, and security had been heightened  in anticipation of 2013 Southeast Asian Games.

References

2013 crimes in Myanmar
2013 murders in Asia
Attacks in Asia in 2013
Car and truck bombings in Asia
Improvised explosive device bombings in Asia
Mandalay
October 2013 crimes in Asia
October 2013 events in Asia
Terrorist incidents in Asia in 2013
Terrorist incidents in Myanmar
Yangon
Building bombings in Myanmar